Gozdawa may refer to the following places in Poland:
Gozdawa, Lower Silesian Voivodeship (south-west Poland)
Gozdawa, Kuyavian-Pomeranian Voivodeship (north-central Poland)
Gozdawa, Masovian Voivodeship (east-central Poland)
Gozdawa, Pomeranian Voivodeship (north Poland)

See also
Gozdawa Coat of Arms